Foça Castle, also known as Beşkapılar Castle, is a coastal  fortification in İzmir Province, western Turkey.

The fortification wall around the ancient city of Phocaea was built in 590-580 BC. The walls underwent restoration during the Byzantine Empire era. The castle was a part of the Republic of Genoa in the 13th century, and it was rebuilt by the Genovese. In the 14th century, Ottoman prince Şehzade Halil was kidnapped and retained in the castle. The fortification was restored in 1538 by Ottomans after the city was annexed.

The castle stretches over the peninsula. Athena temple marks the northernmost end and the five gates collectively known as Beşkapılar (“Five Gates”)  mark the southwestern end. Beşkapılar was used as a boatshed during the Ottoman Empire.

In 2013, Foça Castle was included in the list of World Heritage Sites in Turkey (Tentative list).

References

History of İzmir Province
Foça District
Castles in Turkey
Coastal fortifications
Ancient Greek archaeological sites in Turkey
World Heritage Tentative List for Turkey
Phocaea